Philippe Marcombes (5 December 1877 - 13 June 1935) was a French politician. He served in the Chamber of Deputies from 1928 to 1935, representing Puy-de-Dôme. He was also the Minister of National Education from 7 June 1935 to 13 June 1935.

His son Eugène married the writer Geneviève Viollet-le-Duc, a great-granddaughter of the architect Eugène Viollet-le-Duc.

References

External links
 

1877 births
1935 deaths
People from Cantal
Politicians from Auvergne-Rhône-Alpes
Radical Party (France) politicians
French Ministers of National Education
Members of the 14th Chamber of Deputies of the French Third Republic
Members of the 15th Chamber of Deputies of the French Third Republic